Parviz Varjavand (alao Romanized as "Parviz Varjāvand"; 5 January 1934 – 10 June 2007) was a notable Iranian archaeologist, researcher, university professor and politician who was a prominent member of Iran National Front.

Early life and political career
He was born on 5 January 1934 in Tehran. Professor Varjavand graduated with an MA from the University of Tehran and also obtained a PhD in the Renovation of Monuments and Classical Architecture of Iran from the University of Sorbonne in France.

He was caretaker of Ministry of Arts and Culture in Interim Government of Mehdi Bazargan.

He was a member of the leadership council and spokesperson of National Front of Iran.

Varjavand was active in cultural heritage affairs and he made efforts to register Persepolis, the Choghazanbil Ziggurat and Naqsh-e Jahan complex on the UNESCO World Heritage List.

Death
He died on 10 June 2007, in Milad Hospital at the age of 73.

References

Iranian archaeologists
Iranian Iranologists
University of Tehran alumni
University of Paris alumni
Government ministers of Iran
Academic staff of the University of Tehran
1934 births
2007 deaths
National Front (Iran) politicians
20th-century archaeologists
Faculty of Letters and Humanities of the University of Tehran alumni
Faculty of Social Sciences of the University of Tehran alumni